Achariya Arts and Science College (AASC) is a college located in Villianur, Puducherry, India. The college is affiliated with Pondicherry University. This college offers different courses in arts, commerce and science.

Departments

Science
Mathematics
Biotechnology
Information Technology
Visual Communication
Computer Science
Computer Applications

Arts and Commerce
English
Business Administration
Commerce

Accreditation
The college is  recognized by the University Grants Commission (UGC).

References

Universities and colleges in Puducherry
Puducherry district
Colleges affiliated to Pondicherry University